Ghost Adventures is an American paranormal and reality television series that premiered on October 17, 2008, on the Travel Channel before moving to Discovery+ in 2021. An independent film of the same name originally aired on the Sci-Fi Channel on July 25, 2007. The program follows ghost hunters Zak Bagans, Nick Groff (season 1–10), Aaron Goodwin, Billy Tolley, and Jay Wasley as they investigate locations that are reported to be haunted.

Premise
Ghost Adventures began as an independent film, produced in a documentary style. It was filmed in 2004 and produced by 4Reel Productions in 2006. The SciFi Channel premiered 4Reel's Ghost Adventures on July 25, 2007. The film centered on the trio's investigation of alleged paranormal activity in and around Virginia City, Nevada, including the Goldfield Hotel in Goldfield, Nevada. The crew returned there during the series' fourth, fifth, and seventh seasons. The series is produced by MY-Tupelo Entertainment (a merger of MY Entertainment and Tupelo-Honey Productions).

Methodology

Zak Bagans, Nick Groff (seasons 1–10), Aaron Goodwin, Billy Tolley, and Jay Wasley investigate reportedly haunted locations, hoping to collect visual or auditory evidence of paranormal activity. Each episode begins with the crew touring the investigation site with its owners or caretakers. These introductions typically include Bagans's voice-overs of the site's history as well as interviews with people who claim to have witnessed paranormal phenomena there. On the basis of these interviews, the crew place X's with black or gray tape at the sites of some serious alleged paranormal activity. They later return to these spots in order to set up static night-vision cameras to try and film it happening.

After completing the walk-through, they discuss their strategy, then are locked in the location overnight, which they believe will prevent "audio contamination" and extraneous shadows. They use a variety of equipment, including digital thermometers, electromagnetic field (EMF) meters, handheld digital video cameras, audio recorders, the Ovilus device, point of view cameras, and infrared night-vision cameras in an effort to capture evidence of ghosts. The members sometimes place what they call 'trigger' objects and shout verbal taunts they believe ghosts might move or respond to.

The video and audio collected during each investigation is analyzed after the investigation, and the whole thing is cut down to fit one hour. The most prominent pieces of evidence found are then presented at the appropriate times they happened during the investigation and each one is explained.

During the series, the crew claims to have captured and experienced various Fortean phenomena, which they say include simultaneous equipment malfunctions such as battery drain, voltage spikes, fluctuations in electromagnetic fields, sudden changes in temperature (such as cold spots), unexplained noises, electronic voice phenomena (EVP), and apparitions.

The crew also claims to have recorded spirit possessions on video. Bagans believes that he was possessed at the Preston School of Industry and at Poveglia Island in Italy. Groff claims that he was overtaken by a "dark energy" at the Moon River Brewing Company. Goodwin claims he was "under the influence of a dark spirit" at Bobby Mackey's Music World and Winchester Mystery House. Goodwin is often left alone in the alleged "hotspots" during lockdowns to see how the spirits will react to Goodwin being alone.

Team members

Zak Bagans (2008–present)
Aaron Goodwin (2008–present)
Billy Tolley (2009–present)
Jay Wasley (2009–present)

Former
Nick Groff (2008–2015)

The following people have appeared as recurring guests in the show as part of the GAC:
 Bill Chappell (2010–2020)
 Mark and Debby Constantino (2008–2014; until their deaths)

Celebrity guests
Ghost Adventures has involved celebrities who have participated in the investigations or appeared as eyewitnesses:

The Real Hollywood Ghost Hunters (Kane Hodder, R. A. Mihailoff, and Rick McCallum): "Pico House" episode
Brendan Schaub – "Peabody-Whitehead Mansion" episode
Chad Lindberg – "Return to Linda Vista Hospital" episode
Vince Neil – "The Riviera Hotel" episode
Jamie Gold – "The Riviera Hotel" episode
Loretta Lynn – "Loretta Lynn's Plantation House" episode
Brit Morgan – "Glen Tavern Inn" episode
Mimi Page – "Glen Tavern Inn" episode
Post Malone – "The Slaughter House" episode
Ciaran O'Keeffe – "Hellfire Caves" episode
Dean Haglund – "Trans-Allegheny Lunatic Asylum" episode
Loren Gray – "Joshua Tree Inn" episode
Holly Madison – "Haunting in the Hills" episode

Series overview

Episodes

Reception
Ghost Adventures became one of the most popular shows on Travel Channel. Since its debut it has found an audience for its mix of paranormal investigation, history, and interpersonal drama, and fan reception has been generally positive. Ghost Adventures also helped popularize paranormal television and ghost hunting during its original run on Travel Channel. The show now airs on Discovery+ as well as Amazon Prime.

Controversies
In the Halloween special titled Ghost Adventures Live, which was broadcast from the Trans-Allegheny Lunatic Asylum on October 30, 2009, controversy arose when Robert Bess, inventor of the Parabot Containment Chamber (said to attract and empower spirits using energy, giving them form), claims to have had an EMF meter knocked violently out of his hands.  However, upon investigation of the video, it was found that he had actually thrown it. In the November 6, 2009, follow-up Ghost Adventures Live: Post Mortem, hosts Bagans and Groff reviewed the video and concluded that they couldn't claim any paranormal explanation for the incident.

Related productions

Spin-offs

Ghost Adventures: Aftershocks

Ghost Adventures: Aftershocks is a series that premiered on Saturday April 26, 2014, on the Travel Channel. The three season miniseries features Zak Bagans interviewing former Ghost Adventures interviewees to find out how their lives have changed since those GAC "lockdowns"/investigations from the past. Any new audio and/or video evidence that was not shown before, in previous Ghost Adventures episodes, are also revealed.

Ghost Adventures: Where Are They Now?
Ghost Adventures: Where Are They Now? premiered on Friday August 30, 2019, on the Travel Channel. The series aired as a 5 episode miniseries all under 10 minutes each featuring Zak revisiting some of Ghost Adventures' most chilling paranormal investigations. He follows up with the real people featured on fan-favorite episodes to find out what happened after the crew left.

Ghost Adventures: Serial Killer Spirits
Ghost Adventures: Serial Killer Spirits premiered on Saturday October 5, 2019, on the Travel Channel. The series aired as a 4 part miniseries featuring Zak and the crew visiting locations across the United States teeming with the dark energies of serial killers.

Ghost Adventures: Screaming Room!

Ghost Adventures: Screaming Room! premiered on January 2, 2020, on the Travel Channel. There were 13 episodes announced for the first season and second season with Zak, Aaron, Jay and Billy opening up to viewers in their screening room (a.k.a. "screaming room") to watch their favorite episodes.

Ghost Adventures: Quarantine
Ghost Adventures: Quarantine premiered on June 11, 2020, on the Travel Channel. The series aired as a 4 part miniseries featuring Zak and the crew locked inside his Haunted Museum for 10 days during the 2020 COVID-19 pandemic. The first episode of this miniseries started filming during the start of Nevada state lockdown on March 30. It was titled "Perimeter of Fear" where GAC investigated the Jack Kevorkian van room where women have fainted, the Natalie Wood room and a display of haunted dolls.

Ghost Adventures: Top 10
Ghost Adventures: Top 10 premiered on Saturday January 2, 2021, on Discovery+. The series aired as an 8 episode miniseries. Zak Bagans counts down fans' favorite moments from Ghost Adventures. It's a fun yet terrifying walk down memory lane as Zak revisits the scariest, funniest and most insane clips from episodes past and presents some of the crew's best paranormal evidence.

Ghost Adventures: House Calls

Ghost Adventures: House Calls premiered on Thursday May 19, 2022, on Discovery+. The series will air as an 8 part miniseries. Zak Bagans investigates the haunted homes of everyday people who are living in terror with nowhere else to turn; Zak and his crew enter each residence armed with equipment to document the unexplained activity.

Other

Paranormal Challenge

Paranormal Challenge is a competitive paranormal reality show that premiered on June 17, 2011, on the Travel Channel, with one season aired to date. The show is hosted by Zak Bagans, who challenges ghost hunters from around the United States to go head-to-head in a weekly competition to gather paranormal evidence by spending a night in reportedly haunted locations in the United States.

Deadly Possessions

Deadly Possessions (also known as Ghost Adventures: Artifacts) is a series that premiered on April 2, 2016, on the Travel Channel. The series aired one season and features Zak Bagans as he gathers artifacts for his new museum in Las Vegas, Nevada. The show reveals the dark history of the items, as well as associated paranormal claims.

Demon House

Demon House premiered on Friday March 16, 2018, with Lost Footage from the film being released on January 1, 2019 and an Uncut version airing shortly after on February 16, 2019, on the Travel Channel. After buying a haunted home in Indiana over the phone, sight unseen, paranormal investigator Zak Bagans and his crew are unprepared for the demonic forces that await them at the location referred to as a "Portal to Hell."

The Haunted Museum

The Haunted Museum premiered on Saturday October 2, 2021, on Discovery+. There were 9 episodes announced for the first season. Paranormal investigator and host of Ghost Adventures Zak Bagans joins forces with filmmaker Eli Roth, the modern master of horror, to present a terrifying film anthology inspired by pieces found in Zak’s personal collection of haunted artifacts.

Distribution

International
Ghost Adventures is currently on air or streaming in the following countries and channels:
  on TLC, Foxtel Go
  on DTour, Discovery+
  on Discovery+ (2020–present)
  on AXN Sci Fi and DMAX
  on FOKUS TV
  on Planète+ A&E – CStar
  on DMAX
  on A&E Germany
  on Spike
  on Spike
  on Prima ZOOM
  on Travel Channel and Discovery+ (2021–present)
  on Discovery+
  on Travel Channel – Sky Cable and Cignal PH
  on Travel Channel – DStv
  on TrueVisions
  on TLC
  on Max by Discovery+

Home media
The documentary which the series was based on was released on DVD by Echo Bridge Home Entertainment on October 5, 2010. Season 1 was released on DVD on August 18, 2009, the Season 2 DVD was released on September 14, 2010, Season 3 was released on September 6, 2011, Season 4 on September 4, 2012, and Season 5 on February 24, 2014.

Many episodes are available to stream on Discovery+. However, it is missing key episodes that primarily feature Mark and Debby Constantino as guest investigators out of respect to them and their families, such episodes include "Washoe Club and Chollar Mine", "Goldfield", "Mustang Ranch", "Winchester Mystery House" to name but a few. Other episodes that are currently missing include the original Documentary film, any version of the Trans Allegheny Lunatic Asylum live episode, and the "La Palazza" episode.

See also
 Ghost hunting
 Ghostlore
 List of ghost films
 Paranormal television
 The Dead Files
 Kindred Spirits
Destination Fear

Footnotes

References

External links

 

 
Travel Channel original programming
Paranormal reality television series
2008 American television series debuts